Xoan singing or hát xoan (Chữ Nôm: 咭春) is a genre of Vietnamese folk music performed in spring during the first two months of the lunar new year (Tết) in Phú Thọ Province. The genre includes acting, ceremony, chant, dancing, drumming, and singing; with themes involve romance, riddles, and work. Traditionally occurring in temples, shrines, and communal homes, the songs are performed by a guild, led by a trùm, consisting of male instrumentalists, or kép, and female singers, or đào. A guild consists of ten to fifteen performers, but there are few remaining, increasingly aging, guilds and teachers of this primarily oral tradition.

There are three types of xoan singing: honoring Hùng kings and village guardian spirits; wishing for good crops, health, and luck; and festive courtship songs alternating male and female voices. The texture is "spare"; perfect fourths are prominent; and instruments include drums and clappers.

Hát is singing or acting and "xoan" derives from "xuân" ("spring"). Hát xoan has been inscribed on the List of Intangible Cultural Heritage in Need of Urgent Safeguarding since 2011.

References

External links

Media services: "Viet Nam: Xoan singing of Phú Thọ Province", UNESCO.org.
"Xoan Singing", Vietnam-Culture.com.
"Xoan singing in Phu Tho Province", VietnamTourism.com.
"Xoan singing is heritage in need of preservation: UNESCO", ThanhNienNews.com.

Vietnamese music
Masterpieces of the Oral and Intangible Heritage of Humanity